Kim Seon-dong (Korean: 김선동; Hanja: 金先東; RR: Gim Seondong; born 9 September 1967) is a South Korean politician. He was the presidential nominee of the People's United Party in the 2017 South Korean presidential election.

Early life and education 
Kim was born on September 9, 1967 in Goheung-gun, South Jeolla Province, South Korea. He graduated from Korea University.

Political career

Representative of Suncheon (2011-2014) 
Kim ran under the Democratic Labor Party and was elected as representative of Suncheon in 2011 during snap elections. He opposed the passing of the United States-Korea Free Trade Agreement in 2011 and opened a can of tear gas in the National Assembly as a protest. As a result, he was removed from his position on June 12, 2014. He said he did not regret his actions.

Presidential Nominee of the People's United Party (2016) 
Kim joined the People's United Party on March 20, 2016 along with Kim Jae-yeon; a fellow progressive politician. He was the presidential nominee of the People's United Party for the 2017 South Korean presidential election. He came in eighth place however, only receiving 0.08% of the vote.

2020 South Korean legislative election 
He announced that he will be running for representative of Suncheon in the upcoming 2020 South Korean legislative election.

References 

1967 births
Living people
South Korean politicians